The Boston Landmarks Commission (BLC) is the historic preservation agency for the City of Boston. The commission was created by state legislation in 1975.

History
Urban renewal in the United States started with the Housing Act of 1949, part of President Harry Truman's Fair Deal. In Boston, almost a third of the old city was demolished, including the historic West End, to make way for a new highway, low- and moderate-income high-rises, and new government and commercial buildings. The Boston Landmarks Commission was created by legislation in 1975 as a response to the mass demolitions, particularly the demolition of the Jordan Marsh Building on Washington Street. Built in the 1860s, the ornate building featured a well-known corner clock tower designed by Nathaniel J. Bradlee. Along with an entire row of annex buildings, the building was torn down in 1975 and replaced by a new building. Public outrage and grass roots protests influenced preservation legislation and sparked  preservation action. There are now over 8000 landmarked properties in Boston.

Responsibilities
The chief responsibilities of the Landmark Commission include identifying historic resources through preservation surveys, protecting and recognizing historic properties through designation, and preserving designated Landmarks through the design review process.

The BLC also administers Article 85 Demolition Delay for the entire city of Boston. Whenever a building proposed to be demolished is determined by BLC staff to be significant, the public is invited to testify at a public hearing. If the BLC invokes a 90-day Demolition Delay as a result, there is an opportunity for the community to participate in discussions with the developer and explore alternatives to demolition.

The Commission meets twice a month on second and fourth Tuesdays - Design Review starts a few hours prior to the business portion at every fourth Tuesday hearing. Applicants propose changes to a Landmark by presenting at the hearing, and the public is invited to comment.

Commissioners
Commissioners are nominated by professional and neighborhood organizations, and appointed by the Mayor. Most are also confirmed by City Council. All commissioner positions are voluntary. There are 85 commissioner slots among the Boston Landmarks Commission and the 9 local historic commissions, although BLC commissioners also hold slots on local commissions.

Historic Districts
There are currently 7 historic designated districts and 2 architectural districts. Each district has its own commission staffed by a preservation planner within the Boston Landmarks Commission. The commissioners assure that the architectural and historical integrity of the district is not compromised. 
The districts include:
Historic Beacon Hill District 
Back Bay Architectural District 
Bay State Road/ Back Bay West Architectural Conservation District 
St. Botolph Architectural Conservation District 
Bay Village Historic District 
South End Landmark District 
Mission Hill Triangle Architectural Conservation District 
Aberdeen Architectural Conservation District 
Fort Point Channel Landmark District 

Fort Point was most recently designated in 2008 after the Boston Wharf Co.-owned 55-acre industrial area was sold to several buyers.

See also
Boston Landmark

References

1975 establishments in Massachusetts
Government agencies established in 1975
Historic preservation organizations in the United States